Season 6 of the Indian competitive reality TV series MasterChef India premiered on Star Plus on 7 December 2019 and concluded on 1 March 2020. 

Vikas Khanna returned as one of the judges for the show while Kunal Kapur and Zorawar Kalra were replaced by Ranveer Brar and Vineet Bhatia. This season marked Khanna's fifth consecutive season serving as a judge on the show and Brar's second season, who was last seen in the fourth season. This season was also comeback for Gunjan Joshi as the writer of the show, who was also writer of Season 3 and 4.

Abinas Nayak, an IT Analyst from Odisha was declared as the winner on 1 March 2020, with Oindrila Bala of West Bengal being the runner-up. 

Similar to the past seasons, Amul remained the title sponsor of the show. Additionally, Sleek Kitchens by Asian Paints co-sponsored this season.

Format
Top 30 contestants were chosen from nationwide auditions, of which only 15 advanced to the main competition.

Top 15

Elimination Table

 (WINNER) This cook won the competition.
 (RUNNER-UP) This cook finished in second place.
 (WIN) The cook won the Mystery Box challenge, or any other individual / pair challenge.
 (WIN) The cook was on the winning team in the Team Challenge and directly advanced to the next round.
 (TOP) The cook was one of the top entries in the individual challenge.
 (IMN) The cook won an Immunity Pin in a given challenge.
 (WIN) The cook won the Ticket to Finale Challenge and was directly promoted as a finalist.
 (SAFE) The cook didn't participate in the challenge as he/she already advanced to the next round.
 (IN) The cook wasn't selected as a top or bottom entry in an individual / pair challenge.
 (IN) The cook wasn't selected as a top or bottom entry in a team challenge.
 (PT) The cook competed in the Elimination Test, and advanced.
 (LOSE) The cook was on the losing team in the Team Challenge and had to compete in the upcoming elimination challenge.
 (WEAK) The cook was one of the bottom entries in an individual challenge.
 (BTM) The cook was one of the bottom entries in an individual challenge and had to compete in the upcoming elimination challenge.
 (RET) The cook won the Wild Card Challenge and returned to the competition.
 (X) This cook did not participate in the challenge(s).
 (ELIM) The cook was eliminated from MasterChef.

Episodes

References

MasterChef India
2019 Indian television seasons
2020 Indian television seasons